The 2003–04 Arkansas Razorbacks men's basketball team represented the University of Arkansas in the 2003–04 college basketball season. The head coach was Stan Heath, serving for his second year. The team played its home games in Bud Walton Arena in Fayetteville, Arkansas.

Schedule

|-
!colspan=9| 2004 SEC men's basketball tournament

Source:

References

Arkansas
Arkansas Razorbacks men's basketball seasons
Razor
Razor